Clint Hill may refer to:

 Clint Hill (Secret Service) (born 1932), former United States Secret Service agent
 Clint Hill (footballer) (born 1978), English footballer
 Clint Hill (rugby league) (born 1981), former rugby league footballer